FK Mladost Carev Dvor is a football club based in the village of Carev Dvor near Resen, North Macedonia. They was recently played in the Macedonian First League.

History
The club was founded in 1930.

After promotion to the Macedonian Second League in 2014, in 2015 the club won promotion to the Macedonian First League for the first time in his history, but in the following season, Mladost was relegated after taking the last place in the league. But that was not the end of their problems, because the club withdrew from the Second League due to financial problems.

Honours
 Macedonian Second League:
Runners-up (1): 2014–15

References

External links
Club info at MacedonianFootball 
Football Federation of Macedonia 

Football clubs in North Macedonia
FK Mladost Carev Dvor
Association football clubs established in 1930
1930 establishments in Yugoslavia